An armillary sphere (variations are known as spherical astrolabe, armilla, or armil) is a model of objects in the sky (on the celestial sphere), consisting of a spherical framework of rings, centered on Earth or the Sun, that represent lines of celestial longitude and latitude and other astronomically important features, such as the ecliptic. As such, it differs from a celestial globe, which is a smooth sphere whose principal purpose is to map the constellations. It was invented separately first in ancient China during the 4th century BC and ancient Greece during  the 3rd century BC, with later uses in the Islamic world and Medieval Europe.

With the Earth as center, an armillary sphere is known as Ptolemaic. With the Sun as center, it is known as Copernican.

The flag of Portugal features an armillary sphere. The armillary sphere is also featured in Portuguese heraldry, associated with the Portuguese discoveries during the Age of Exploration. Manuel I of Portugal, for example, took it as one of his symbols where it appeared on his standard, and on early Chinese export ceramics made for the Portuguese court. In the flag of the Empire of Brazil, the armillary sphere is also featured.

The Beijing Capital International Airport Terminal 3 features a large armillary sphere metal sculpture as an exhibit of Chinese inventions for international and domestic visitors.

Description and use 

The exterior parts of this machine are a compages [or framework] of brass rings, which represent the principal circles of the heavens.

 The equinoctial A, which is divided into 360 degrees (beginning at its intersection with the ecliptic in Aries) for showing the sun's right ascension in degrees; and also into 24 hours, for showing its right ascension in time.
 The ecliptic B, which is divided into 12 signs, and each sign into 30 degrees, and also into the months and days of the year; in such a manner, that the degree or point of the ecliptic in which the sun is, on any given day, stands over that day in the circle of months.
 The tropic of Cancer C, touching the ecliptic at the beginning of Cancer in e, and the tropic of Capricorn D, touching the ecliptic at the beginning of Capricorn in f; each 23 degrees from the equinoctial circle.
 The Arctic Circle E, and the Antarctic Circle F, each 23 degrees from its respective pole at N and S.
 The equinoctial colure G, passing through the north and south poles of the heaven at N and S, and through the equinoctial points Aries and Libra, in the ecliptic.
 The solstitial colure H, passing through the poles of the heaven, and through the solstitial points Cancer and Capricorn, in the ecliptic.  Each quarter of the former of these colures is divided into 90 degrees, from the equinoctial to the poles of the world, for showing the declination of the sun, moon, and stars; and each quarter of the latter, from the ecliptic as e and f, to its poles b and d, for showing the latitude of the stars.

In the north pole of the ecliptic is a nut b, to which is fixed one end of the quadrantal wire, and to the other end a small sun Y, which is carried round the ecliptic B—B, by turning the nut : and in the south pole of the ecliptic is a pin d, on which is another quadrantal wire, with a small moon Ζ upon it, which may be moved round by hand : but there is a particular contrivance for causing the moon to move in an orbit which crosses the ecliptic at an angle of 5 degrees, to opposite points called the moon's nodes; and also for shifting these points backward in the ecliptic, as the moon's nodes shift in the heaven.

Within these circular rings is a small terrestrial globe I, fixed on an axis K, which extends from the north and south poles of the globe at n and s, to those of the celestial sphere at N and S. On this axis is fixed the flat celestial meridian L L, which may be set directly over the meridian of any place on the globe, so as to keep over the same meridian upon it. This flat meridian is graduated the same way as the brass meridian of the common globe, and its use is much the same. To this globe is fitted the movable horizon M, so as to turn upon the two strong wires proceeding from its east and west points to the globe, and entering the globe at the opposite points off its equator, which is a movable brass ring set into the globe in a groove all around its equator. The globe may be turned by hand within this ring, so as to place any given meridian upon it, directly under the celestial meridian L. The horizon is divided into 360 degrees all around its outermost edge, within which are the points of the compass, for showing the amplitude of the sun and the moon, both in degrees and points. The celestial meridian L passes through two notches in the north and south points of the horizon, as in a common globe: both here, if the globe be turned round, the horizon and meridian turn with it. At the south pole of the sphere is a circle of 25 hours, fixed to the rings, and on the axis is an index which goes round that circle, if the globe be turned round its axis.

The whole fabric is supported on a pedestal N, and may be elevated or depressed upon the joint O, to any number of degrees from 0 to 90, by means of the arc P, which is fixed in the strong brass arm Q, and slides in the upright piece R, in which is a screw at r, to fix it at any proper elevation.

In the box T are two wheels (as in Dr Long's sphere) and two pinions, whose axes come out at V and U; either of which may be turned by the small winch W. When the winch is put upon the axis V, and turn backward, the terrestrial globe, with its horizon and celestial meridian, keep at rest; and the whole sphere of circles turns round from east, by south, to west, carrying the sun Y, and moon Z, round the same way, and causing them to rise above and set below the horizon. But when the winch is put upon the axis U, and turned forward, the sphere with the sun and moon keep at rest; and the earth, with its horizon and meridian, turn round from horizon to the sun and moon, to which these bodies came when the earth kept at rest, and they were carried round it; showing that they rise and set in the same points of the horizon, and at the same times in the hour circle, whether the motion be in the earth or in the heaven. If the earthly globe be turned, the hour-index goes round its hour-circle; but if the sphere be turned, the hour-circle goes round below the index.

And so, by this construction, the machine is equally fitted to show either the real motion of the earth, or the apparent motion of the heavens.

To rectify the sphere for use, first slacken the screw r in the upright stem R, and taking hold of the arm Q, move it up or down until the given degree of latitude for any place be at the side of the stem R; and then the axis of the sphere will be properly elevated, so as to stand parallel to the axis of the world, if the machine be set north and south by a small compass: this done, count the latitude from the north pole, upon the celestial meridian L, down towards the north notch of the horizon, and set the horizon to that latitude; then, turn the nut b until the sun Y comes to the given day of the year in the ecliptic, and the sun will be at its proper place for that day: find the place of the moon's ascending node, and also the place of the moon, by an Ephemeris, and set them right accordingly: lastly, turn the winch W, until either the sun comes to the meridian L, or until the meridian comes to the sun (according as you want the sphere or earth to move) and set the hour-index to the XII, marked noon, and the whole machine will be rectified. — Then turn the winch, and observe when the sun or moon rise and set in the horizon, and the hour-index will show the times thereof for the given day.

History

China

Throughout Chinese history, astronomers have created celestial globes to assist the observation of the stars. The Chinese also used the armillary sphere in aiding calendrical computations and calculations.

According to Joseph Needham, the earliest development of the armillary sphere in China goes back to the astronomers Shi Shen and Gan De in the 4th century BC, as they were equipped with a primitive single-ring armillary instrument. This would have allowed them to measure the north polar distance (declination) a measurement that gave the position in a xiu (right ascension). Needham's 4th century dating, however, is rejected by British sinologist Christopher Cullen, who traces the beginnings of these devices to the 1st century BC.

During the Western Han dynasty (202 BC9 AD) additional developments made by the astronomers Luoxia Hong (落下閎), Xiangyu Wangren, and Geng Shouchang (耿壽昌) advanced the use of the armillary in its early stage of evolution. In 52 BC, it was the astronomer Geng Shouchang who introduced the first permanently fixed equatorial ring of the armillary sphere. In the subsequent Eastern Han dynasty (23–220 AD) period, the astronomers Fu An and Jia Kui added the ecliptic ring by 84 AD. With the famous statesman, astronomer, and inventor Zhang Heng (張衡, 78–139 AD), the sphere was totally complete in 125 AD, with horizon and meridian rings. The world's first water-powered celestial globe was created by Zhang Heng, who operated his armillary sphere by use of an inflow clepsydra clock (see Zhang's article for more detail).

Subsequent developments were made after the Han dynasty that improved the use of the armillary sphere. In 323 AD the Chinese astronomer Kong Ting was able to reorganize the arrangement of rings on the armillary sphere so that the ecliptic ring could be pegged on to the equator at any point desired. The Chinese astronomer and mathematician Li Chunfeng (李淳風) of the Tang dynasty created one in 633 AD with three spherical layers to calibrate multiple aspects of astronomical observations, calling them 'nests' (chhung). He was also responsible for proposing a plan of having a sighting tube mounted ecliptically in order for the better observation of celestial latitudes. However, it was the Tang Chinese astronomer, mathematician, and monk Yi Xing in the next century who would accomplish this addition to the model of the armillary sphere. Ecliptical mountings of this sort were found on the armillary instruments of Zhou Cong and Shu Yijian in 1050, as well as Shen Kuo's armillary sphere of the later 11th century, but after that point they were no longer employed on Chinese armillary instruments until the arrival of the European Jesuits.

In 723 AD, Yi Xing (一行) and government official Liang Ling-zan (梁令瓚) combined Zhang Heng's water powered celestial globe with an escapement device. With drums hit every quarter-hour and bells rung automatically every full hour, the device was also a striking clock. The famous clock tower that the Chinese polymath Su Song built by 1094 during the Song dynasty would employ Yi Xing's escapement with waterwheel scoops filled by clepsydra drip, and powered a crowning armillary sphere, a central celestial globe, and mechanically operated manikins that would exit mechanically opened doors of the clock tower at specific times to ring bells and gongs to announce the time, or to hold plaques announcing special times of the day. There was also the scientist and statesman Shen Kuo (1031–1095). Being the head official for the Bureau of Astronomy, Shen Kuo was an avid scholar of astronomy, and improved the designs of several astronomical instruments: the gnomon, armillary sphere, clepsydra clock, and sighting tube fixed to observe the pole star indefinitely. When Jamal al-Din of Bukhara was asked to set up an 'Islamic Astronomical Institution' in Khubilai Khan's new capital during the Yuan dynasty, he commissioned a number of astronomical instruments, including an armillary sphere. It was noted that "Chinese astronomers had been building [them] since at least 1092".

India
The armillary sphere was used for observation in India since early times, and finds mention in the works of Āryabhata (476 CE). The Goladīpikā—a detailed treatise dealing with globes and the armillary sphere was composed between 1380 and 1460 CE by Parameśvara. On the subject of the usage of the armillary sphere in India, Ōhashi (2008) writes: "The Indian armillary sphere (gola-yantra) was based on equatorial coordinates, unlike the Greek armillary sphere, which was based on ecliptical coordinates, although the Indian armillary sphere also had an ecliptical hoop. Probably, the celestial coordinates of the junction stars of the lunar mansions were determined by the armillary sphere since the seventh century or so. There was also a celestial globe rotated by flowing water."

Hellenistic world and ancient Rome 

The Greek astronomer Hipparchus (c. 190c. 120 BC) credited Eratosthenes (276194 BC) as the inventor of the armillary sphere. Names of this device in Greek include  astrolabos and  krikōtē sphaira "ringed sphere". The English name of this device comes ultimately from the Latin armilla (circle, bracelet), since it has a skeleton made of graduated metal circles linking the poles and representing the equator, the ecliptic, meridians and parallels. Usually a ball representing the Earth or, later, the Sun is placed in its center. It is used to demonstrate the motion of the stars around the Earth. Before the advent of the European telescope in the 17th century, the armillary sphere was the prime instrument of all astronomers in determining celestial positions.

In its simplest form, consisting of a ring fixed in the plane of the equator, the armilla is one of the most ancient of astronomical instruments. Slightly developed, it was crossed by another ring fixed in the plane of the meridian. The first was an equinoctial, the second a solstitial armilla. Shadows were used as indices of the sun's positions, in combinations with angular divisions. When several rings or circles were combined representing the great circles of the heavens, the instrument became an armillary sphere.

Armillary spheres were developed by the Hellenistic Greeks and were used as teaching tools already in the 3rd century BC. In larger and more precise forms they were also used as observational instruments. However, the fully developed armillary sphere with nine circles perhaps did not exist until the mid-2nd century AD, during the Roman Empire. Eratosthenes most probably used a solstitial armilla for measuring the obliquity of the ecliptic. Hipparchus probably used an armillary sphere of four rings. The Greco-Roman geographer and astronomer Ptolemy (c. 100–170 AD) describes his instrument, the astrolabon, in his Almagest. It consisted of at least three rings, with a graduated circle inside of which another could slide, carrying two small tubes positioned opposite each other and supported by a vertical plumb-line.

Medieval Middle East and Europe

Persian and Arab astronomers produced an improved version of the Greek armillary sphere in the 8th century, and wrote about it in the treatise of Dhat al-Halaq or The instrument with the rings by the Persian astronomer Fazari (d.c. 777). Abbas Ibn Firnas (d.887) is thought to have produced another instrument with rings (armillary sphere) in the 9th century which he gave to Caliph Muhammad I (ruled 852–886). The spherical astrolabe, a variation of both the astrolabe and the armillary sphere, was invented during the Middle Ages in the Middle East. About 550 AD, Christian philosopher John Philoponus wrote a treatise on the astrolabe in Greek, which is the earliest extant treatise on the instrument. The earliest description of the spherical astrolabe dates back to the Persian astronomer Nayrizi (fl. 892–902). Muslim astronomers also independently invented the celestial globe, which were used primarily for solving problems in celestial astronomy. Today, 126 such instruments remain worldwide, the oldest from the 11th century. The altitude of the sun, or the Right Ascension and Declination of stars could be calculated with these by inputting the location of the observer on the meridian ring of the globe.

The armillary sphere was reintroduced to Western Europe via Al-Andalus in the late 10th century with the efforts of Gerbert d'Aurillac, the later Pope Sylvester II (r. 999–1003). Pope Sylvester II applied the use of sighting tubes with his armillary sphere in order to fix the position of the pole star and record measurements for the tropics and equator.

Korea

Chinese ideas of astronomy and astronomical instruments were introduced to Korea, where further advancements were also made. Jang Yeong-sil, a Korean inventor, was ordered by King Sejong the Great of Joseon to build an armillary sphere. The sphere, built in 1433 was named Honcheonui (혼천의,渾天儀).

The Honcheonsigye, an armillary sphere activated by a working clock mechanism was built by the Korean astronomer Song Iyeong in 1669. It is the only remaining astronomical clock from the Joseon dynasty. The mechanism of the armillary sphere succeeded that of Sejong era's armillary sphere (Honŭi 渾儀, 1435) and celestial sphere (Honsang 渾象, 1435), and the Jade Clepsydra (Ongnu 玉漏, 1438)'s sun-carriage apparatus. Such mechanisms are similar to Ch'oe Yu-ji (崔攸之, 1603~1673)'s armillary sphere(1657). The structure of time going train and the mechanism of striking-release in the part of clock is influenced by the crown escapement which has been developed from 14th century, and is applied to gear system which had been improved until the middle of 17th century in Western-style clockwork. In particular, timing device of Song I-yŏng's Armillary Clock adopts the early 17th century pendulum clock system which could remarkably improve the accuracy of a clock.

Renaissance

Further advances in this instrument were made by Danish astronomer Tycho Brahe (1546–1601), who constructed three large armillary spheres which he used for highly precise measurements of the positions of the stars and planets. They were described in his Astronomiae Instauratae Mechanica.

Armillary spheres were among the first complex mechanical devices. Their development led to many improvements in techniques and design of all mechanical devices. Renaissance scientists and public figures often had their portraits painted showing them with one hand on an armillary sphere, which represented the height of wisdom and knowledge.

The armillary sphere survives as useful for teaching, and may be described as a skeleton celestial globe, the series of rings representing the great circles of the heavens, and revolving on an axis within a horizon. With the earth as center such a sphere is known as Ptolemaic; with the sun as center, as Copernican.

A representation of an armillary sphere is present in the modern flag of Portugal and has been a national symbol since the reign of Manuel I.

Seamless celestial globe
In the 1980s, Emilie Savage-Smith discovered several celestial globes without any seams in Lahore and Kashmir. Hollow objects are typically cast in two halves, and Savage-Smith indicates that the casting of a seamless sphere was considered impossible, though techniques such as rotational molding have been used since at least the '60s to produce similarly seamless spheres. The earliest seamless globe was invented in Kashmir by the Muslim astronomer and metallurgist Ali Kashmiri ibn Luqman in 1589–90 (AH 998)  during Akbar the Great's reign; another was produced in 1659–60 (1070 AH) by Muhammad Salih Tahtawi with Arabic and Sanskrit inscriptions; and the last was produced in Lahore by a Hindu astronomer and metallurgist Lala Balhumal Lahori in 1842 during Jagatjit Singh Bahadur's reign. 21 such globes were produced, and these remain the only examples of seamless metal globes. These Mughal metallurgists used the method of lost-wax casting in order to produce these globes.

Paralympic Games 
An artwork-based model of an Armillary sphere has been used since the March 1, 2014 to light the Paralympic heritage flame at Stoke Mandeville Stadium, United Kingdom.  The sphere includes a wheelchair that the user can rotate to spark the flame as part of a ceremony to celebrate the past, present and future of the Paralympic Movement in the UK.  The Armillary Sphere was created by artist Jon Bausor and will be used for future Heritage Flame events.  The flame in the first-ever ceremony was lit by London 2012 gold medallist Hannah Cockroft.

Heraldry and vexillology 

The armillary sphere is commonly used in heraldry and vexillology, being mainly known as a symbol associated with Portugal, the Portuguese Empire and the Portuguese discoveries.

In the end of the 15th century, the armillary sphere became the personal heraldic badge of the future King Manuel I of Portugal, when he was still a Prince. The intense use of this badge in documents, monuments, flags and other supports, during the reign of Manuel I, transformed the armillary sphere from a simple personal symbol to a national one that represented the Kingdom of Portugal and in particular its Overseas Empire. As a national symbol, the armillary sphere continued in use after the death of Manuel I.

In the 17th century, it became associated with the Portuguese dominion of Brazil. In 1815, when Brazil gained the status of kingdom united with that of Portugal, its coat of arms was formalized as a golden armillary sphere in a blue field. Representing Brazil, the armillary sphere became also present in the arms and the flag of the United Kingdom of Portugal, Brazil and the Algarves. When Brazil became independent as an empire in 1822, the armillary sphere continued to be present in its national arms and in its national flag. The celestial sphere of the present Flag of Brazil replaced the armillary sphere in 1889.

The armillary sphere was reintroduced in the national arms and in the national Flag of Portugal in 1911.

See also 

 
 
 
 , describes the late medieval (Ptolemaic) cosmos
 
 , a free-standing 
 
  – largest in the world

References

Sources
 Encyclopædia Britannica (1771), "Geography".
 Darlington, Oscar G. "Gerbert, the Teacher," The American Historical Review (Volume 52, Number 3, 1947): 456–476.
 Kern, Ralf: Wissenschaftliche Instrumente in ihrer Zeit. Vom 15. – 19. Jahrhundert. Verlag der Buchhandlung Walther König 2010, 
 Needham, Joseph (1986). Science and Civilization in China: Volume 3. Taipei: Caves Books, Ltd.
 Sivin, Nathan (1995). Science in Ancient China. Brookfield, Vermont: VARIORUM, Ashgate Publishing
 Williams, Henry Smith (2004). A History Of Science. Whitefish, MT: Kessinger Publishing. .

External links 

 Starry Messenger 
 Armillary Spheres and Teaching Astronomy | Whipple Museum 
 AstroMedia* Verlag in Germany offers a cardboard construction kit for an armillary sphere ("Das Kleine Tischplanetarium")

Ancient Greek astronomy
Ancient inventions
Astronomical instruments
Chinese inventions
Danish inventions
Greek inventions
Sphere
Heraldic charges
Historical scientific instruments
Iranian inventions
Korean inventions